The , or Presiding Officer in English, is the speaker of the Senedd in Wales, elected by Members of the Senedd to chair their meetings (plenary sessions); to maintain order; and to protect the rights of Members.

The  also heads the Corporate Body (known as the Senedd Commission) and as such is viewed as a figurehead for the entire organisation. One  (or Deputy Presiding Officer in English) is also elected to help fulfil the role.

Role of the 
They are responsible for ensuring that business is handled on the basis of equality and impartiality.

The  is also responsible for Standing Orders and is the final authority on their interpretation. The  also acts as Chair of the Senedd Commission, and has special responsibility for promoting democratic engagement, leadership, developing the Senedd's future legislative powers and external relations

The  chairs meetings of the Panel of Subject Committee Chairs, where committee procedures and matters affecting Committee business are discussed.

Current  and

List of Presiding Officers/Llywyddion

List of Deputy Presiding Officers/Dirprwy Lywyddion

See also
Senedd
Senedd Commission

References

External links
 Office of the Llywydd

 
Wales
Legislative speakers in the United Kingdom
Senedd